Barry Davis is an American baseball coach, who is the current the head baseball coach of the Rider Broncs.  He has held that position since prior to the start of the 2005 season.  Under Davis, Rider has reached three NCAA Tournaments, in 2008, 2010 and 2021.  He has been named MAAC Coach of the Year three times: 2006, 2013, and 2015 

Prior to Rider, Davis was the head coach at NJCAA school Gloucester County College (1990–2000) and then-NAIA school Georgia Southwestern State University (2001–2004).  At Gloucester, Davis won four NJCAA Division III national championships.

Davis has been inducted in four Hall of Fames. He was inducted into the Gloucester County College Sports Hall of Fame in 2010. and the Gloucester County Sports Hall of Fame in 2012.
Davis was also inducted into the Bridgewater College Athletic Hall of Fame in 2014 and the NJCAA (National Junior College Athletic Association) Baseball Coaches Hall of Fame in 2016. 

Davis holds a bachelor's degree from Bridgewater College (Virginia) in health and physical education, a master's degree in education from Frostburg State University (Maryland) and a doctoral degree in sports leadership from Concordia University at Chicago.

Head coaching record
Below is a table of Davis's yearly records as a collegiate baseball head coach.

See also
List of current NCAA Division I baseball coaches
Rider Broncs

References

Living people
Year of birth missing (living people)
Bridgewater Eagles baseball players
George Mason Patriots baseball coaches
Georgia Southwestern State Hurricanes baseball coaches
Rowan Roadrunners baseball coaches
Rider Broncs baseball coaches
Frostburg State University alumni
Concordia University Chicago alumni